O Sétimo Selo (in English, The Seventh Seal), is a book written by the Portuguese journalist and writer José Rodrigues dos Santos. It has sold 140,000 copies.

Plot
The plot revolves around a murder that the protagonist, Tomás de Noronha, attempts to solve. While working on the murder, de Noronha discovers the environmental danger the Earth is being exposed to by the human race.

Antarctica, summer of 2002. Howard Dawson, chief scientist at the American Antarctic scientific station, McMurdo, receives a radio contact from the Argentinean scientific station, Marambio. The Argentineans are at the Larsen B ice shelf and report that the shelf is shaking and on the verge of collapse. Puzzled, Dawson requests satellite imagery and is astonished to find the assessment credible. He immediately flies to the Antarctic Peninsula, where Larsen B lies. Once there, he bewilderedly watches the ice shelf disintegrate. Dawson is overwhelmed by the sight of a slab of ice the size of Rhode Island separating from Antarctica, and returns in shock to McMurdo. Alone in his lab, he prepares to file a report on the biggest global warming event ever seen by human eyes.
A stranger step in and points a gun at him.
Bang. Bang, Bang.
The report is never written.
World-famous cryptanalyst Tomás Noronha is approached by Interpol agent Alexander Orlov, who hires him for a strange investigation. Two scientists were killed a few years ago, both on the same day in the summer of 2002: an American in Antarctica and a Spaniard in Barcelona. Both were well acquainted with Filipe Madureira, an old high school friend of Tomás. Filipe has since disappeared, and Interpol wants Tomás to track him down. Orlov also wants the cryptanalyst's help to decipher a message left by the assassins near the victims’ bodies - an ancient biblical mystery:

“666”

The Number of the Beast.
To solve the killer's biblical riddle and to find his long-lost friend, Tomás tries to trace Filipe's last known steps. The investigation puts him in the track of humankind's biggest challenges in the next few years: global warming and the end of oil.
Is there hope?
“When He broke the seventh seal, there was silence in the Heavens”
Thus Revelation announces the beginning of Apocalypse. Based on true scientific data about climate change and genuine Aramco documents dealing with the major problems facing world and Saudi oil production, The Seventh Seal takes us on a daunting journey to the impending disaster facing humankind and our planet.

References

21st-century Portuguese novels
Mystery novels
2007 novels